Town East Mall is an enclosed shopping mall in Mesquite, Texas, a suburb of Dallas, United States of America. Its anchor stores are Macy's (Opened as Sanger-Harris in 1971, became Foley's in 1987, became Macy's in 2006), Dillard's, JCPenney, and Dick’s Sporting Goods.

History

The mall opened on October 6, 1971.

In 1978, the mall was used by director Ron Howard to film portions of the movie Cotton Candy.

In late 2004, the property underwent a $20 million renovation.

Dick's Sporting Goods opened as the 5th anchor store in the mall in March 2018.

On January 29, 2021, it was announced that Sears would be closing as part of a plan to close 23 stores nationwide. The store closed on April 18, 2021.

In 2020 a loan was financed for the mall, however, Brookfield Properties has not been able to pay that loan off and the mall might be foreclosed.

See also
 List of shopping malls in the Dallas/Fort Worth Metroplex

Notes

External links
 

1971 establishments in Texas
Brookfield Properties
Mesquite, Texas
Shopping malls established in 1971
Shopping malls in the Dallas–Fort Worth metroplex